Sobasina yapensis is a species of jumping spider.

Name
The species is named after the Yap island group on which it occurs.

Distribution
Sobasina yapensis is only known from Yap in the Caroline Islands.

References
  (1998): Salticidae of the Pacific Islands. III.  Distribution of Seven Genera, with Description of Nineteen New Species and Two New Genera. Journal of Arachnology  26(2): 149-189. PDF

Salticidae
Fauna of the Federated States of Micronesia
Spiders of Oceania
Spiders described in 1998